Sir Nicholas Steward, 1st Baronet FRS (11 February 1618 – 15 February 1710) of Pylewell Park, Hampshire was an English MP and Chamberlain of the Exchequer.

He was born the eldest son of Simeon Steward of Hartley Mauditt, Hampshire and studied law at Lincoln's Inn.

He was fined by the Parliamentary forces for being a Royalist in 1645. After the Restoration of the Monarchy in 1660 he was created Baronet Steward of Hartley Mauditt and given the sinecure position of Chamberlain of the Exchequer until his death in 1710. He was a Justice of the Peace for Hampshire between 1660 and his death and a Deputy Lieutenant of Hampshire from 1673 to 1676 and 1683 to 1688.

He was elected Member of Parliament for Lymington in a by-election in 1663, sitting until 1679. In 1667 he was elected a Fellow of the Royal Society.

He died in 1710 and was buried in the churchyard of St Leonard's Church, Worldham. He had married Mary, the daughter of Sir Miles Sandys of Miserden, Gloucestershire, with whom he had 3 sons (who all predeceased him) and 7 daughters. He was succeeded as second baronet by his grandson Simeon, son of his youngest son Charles. The family name then became Stuart.

References

1618 births
1710 deaths
Members of Lincoln's Inn
Baronets in the Baronetage of England
English MPs 1661–1679
Fellows of the Royal Society